Al-Harith ibn Abd Allah al-Azdi, also referred to in sources as al-Harith ibn Abd, al-Harith ibn Amr or al-Harith ibn Abd Amr was the Umayyad governor of Basra for four months in early 665 under Caliph Mu'awiya I. Later, he served as the governor of his home territory of Palestine and/or the commander of Palestine's troops in the mid-670s.

Life
He was a tribesman of the Azd from Palestine, where the Azd made up a significant proportion of the district's Arab population.

In the spring of 665 Mu'awiya appointed al-Harith as governor of Basra in place of Abd Allah ibn Amir. Al-Harith made Abd Allah ibn Amr ibn Ghaylan the head of his shurta (select troops). According to al-Tabari (d. 923), al-Harith had been appointed by Mu'awiya as a placeholder to make way for Ziyad ibn Abihi, who became governor four months after al-Harith.

The historians Patricia Crone and Moshe Gil identified him as the "Harith ibn Abd" mentioned as the governor of Palestine under the Umayyad caliph Mu'awiya I in the Arabic and Greek papyri of Nitzana, dated to October 674–February 677. The traditional Muslim sources mention him as the commander of the troops of Palestine under Mu'awiya.

References

Bibliography

7th-century Arabs
Azd
Umayyad governors of Basra
Umayyad governors of Palestine